Korey Lovett (born 27 April 1996) is an American tennis player.

Lovett has a career high ATP singles ranking of 1715 achieved on 20 June 2016.

Lovett made his ATP main draw debut at the 2014 BB&T Atlanta Open in the doubles draw partnering Becker O'Shaughnessey. Lovett also played college tennis at the University of Central Florida.

References

External links
 
 

1996 births
Living people
American male tennis players
People from Brevard, North Carolina
UCF Knights men's tennis players
Tennis people from North Carolina